The Assistant Chief of the Air Staff (ACAS) is a senior appointment in the Royal Air Force. The current ACAS is Air Vice-Marshal Simon Edwards.

The post was originally established circa February 1938, but without being made a member of the Air Council.

The ACAS post was re-established in 1985 by eliminating the Vice Chief of the Air Staff and combining the Policy and Operations two star assistant chiefs. In 1992, ACAS became a member of the Air Force Board. The ACAS is responsible for "assisting the Chief of the Air Staff in generating a balanced and integrated Royal Air Force capability and for maintaining the fighting effectiveness and morale of the Service including the development of policy." One of the many duties of the ACAS is to sit on the board of the Civil Aviation Authority as a non-executive member.

Assistant Chiefs of the Air Staff from 1985
1985–1986: Anthony Skingsley
1987–1989: Michael Simmons
1989–1991: John Thomson
1991–1992: Timothy Garden
1992–1994: Anthony Bagnall
1994–1996: Peter Squire
1996–1998: Timothy Jenner
1998–2000: Jock Stirrup
2000–2003: Philip Sturley
2003–2005: David Walker
2005–2007: Chris Moran
2007–2010: Tim Anderson
2010–2013: Barry North
2013–2015: Edward Stringer
2015–2017: Richard Knighton
2017–2018: Michael Wigston
2018–2019: Gerry Mayhew
2019–2021: Ian Gale
2021–present: Simon Edwards

References

Royal Air Force appointments
1985 establishments in the United Kingdom